William Crawford Gorgas KCMG (October 3, 1854 – July 3, 1920) was a United States Army physician and 22nd Surgeon General of the U.S. Army (1914–1918). He is best known for his work in Florida, Havana and at the Panama Canal in abating the transmission of yellow fever and malaria by controlling the mosquitoes that carry these diseases. At the time, his strategy was greeted with considerable skepticism and opposition to such hygiene measures. However, the measures he put into practice as the head of the Panama Canal Zone Sanitation Commission saved thousands of lives and contributed to the success of the Canal's construction.

He was a Georgist and argued that adopting Henry George's popular 'Single Tax' would be a way to bring about sanitary living conditions, especially for the poor.

Early life and education 
Born in Toulminville, Alabama, Gorgas was the first of six children of Josiah Gorgas and Amelia Gayle Gorgas. After studying at The University of the South and Bellevue Hospital Medical College, Dr. Gorgas was appointed to the US Army Medical Corps in June 1880.

Military career 

He was assigned to three posts—Fort Clark, Fort Duncan, and Fort Brown—in Texas. While at Fort Brown (1882–84), Gorgas survived an episode of yellow fever. He met Marie Cook Doughty who also contracted the disease at the same place and time. Coffins were designated for them both, but they recovered together, forming a bond and soon married.

In 1898, after the end of the Spanish–American War, Gorgas was appointed Chief Sanitary Officer in Havana, where he and Robert Ernest Noble worked to eradicate yellow fever and malaria. Gorgas capitalized on the momentous work of another Army doctor, Major Walter Reed, who had built much of his work on the insights of Cuban doctor, Carlos Finlay, to prove the mosquito transmission of yellow fever. Through his efforts draining both the Aedes mosquito vector breeding ponds and quarantining of yellow fever patients in screened service rooms, cases in Havana plunged from 784 to zero with a year.  He won international fame battling the illness, which was then the scourge of tropical and sub-tropical climates. He worked in Florida, later in Havana, Cuba, and finally, in 1904, at the site of the construction of the Panama Canal.

As chief sanitary officer on the canal project, Gorgas implemented far-reaching sanitary programs, including the draining of ponds and swamps, fumigation, use of mosquito netting, and construction of public water systems. These measures were instrumental in permitting the construction of the Panama Canal, as they significantly prevented illness due to yellow fever and malaria (which had also been shown to be transmitted by mosquitoes in 1898) among the thousands of workers involved in the building project.

Gorgas served as president of the American Medical Association in 1909–10. He was appointed as Surgeon General of the Army in 1914. That same year, Gorgas and George Washington Goethals were awarded the inaugural Public Welfare Medal from the National Academy of Sciences.

Gorgas retired from the Army in 1918, having reached the mandatory retirement age of 64.

Personal life
He was married to Marie Cook Doughty (1862–1929) of Cincinnati. He is buried with her at Arlington National Cemetery, in Arlington, Virginia.

Death and legacy
 He received an honorary knighthood (KCMG) from King George V at the Queen Alexandra Military Hospital in the United Kingdom shortly before his death there on July 3, 1920. He was given a special funeral in St. Paul's Cathedral.

 Gorgas' name features on the Frieze of the London School of Hygiene & Tropical Medicine. Twenty-three names of public health and tropical medicine pioneers were chosen to feature on the School building in Keppel Street when it was constructed in 1926.
 Gorgas, Alabama was named after him.

Awards

Military Awards
 Distinguished Service Medal (U.S. Army)
 Spanish Campaign Medal
 Army of Cuban Occupation Medal
 Victory Medal

Other honors
 Public Welfare Medal – National Academy of Sciences
 Honorary Knight Commander of Michael and George (KCMG) (United Kingdom)

Legacy

 The Gorgas Memorial Institute of Tropical and Preventive Medicine, Incorporated (GMITP), which operated the Gorgas Laboratories in Panama, was founded in 1921 and was named after Dr. Gorgas. With the loss of congressional funding in 1990, the GMITP was closed. The Institute was moved to the University of Alabama in 1992 and carries on the tradition of research, service and training in tropical medicine. The Gorgas Course in Clinical Tropical Medicine is sponsored by the University of Alabama School of Medicine in conjunction with Universidad Peruana Cayetano Heredia in Lima, Peru.
 Gorgas Hospital was a U.S. Army hospital in Panama, previously known as Ancon Hospital and named for Dr. Gorgas in 1928. Now held and operated by Panama, it is home to the Instituto Oncologico Nacional, Panama's Ministry of Health and its Supreme Court.
 In 1947 the Gorgas Science Foundation was founded at Texas Southmost College (on the site of the former Fort Brown). The foundation supports conservation and ecological science research projects worldwide.
 The Gorgas Medal is awarded by the Association of Military Surgeons of the United States (AMSUS)
 In 1953 William C. Gorgas was inducted into the Alabama Hall of Fame.
 Amelia Gayle Gorgas Library and Gorgas' parents' final home, the Gorgas House, located on the campus of The University of Alabama, are named in honor of the Gorgas family.
 Texas Southmost College has a Gorgas Hall named in his honor. The college's campus is located on the grounds of the former Fort Brown.
 The Alabama Power Company renamed its Warrior Reserve Steam Plant on the Black Warrior River near Parrish in honor of Gorgas in the 1920s. Gorgas had testified on behalf of the utility during the previous decade in lawsuits over mosquito-borne illnesses in the vicinity of its Lay Dam hydroelectric reservoir. The coal-fired steam plant was closed in April 2019.
 The German commercial passenger ship-cargo ship SS Prinz Sigismund, after being seized by the United States after it entered World War I on the side of the Allies, had a long American career under the name General W. C. Gorgas (named for Dr. Gorgas). It was owned by the Panama Railroad Company and used for commercial service as SS General W. C. Gorgas from 1917 to 1919 and from 1919 to 1941, it was used as the U.S. Navy troop transport USS General W. C. Gorgas in 1919 after World War I, and as the U.S. Army Transport USAT General W. C. Gorgas from 1941 to 1945 during World War II.
 Gorgas's Rice Rat (Oryzomys gorgasi) is a South American rodent named after Gorgas in 1971.
 The Latin University of Panama (Universidad Latina de Panama) named their health sciences faculty in Gorgas's honor (Facultad de ciencias de la salud Dr. William C. Gorgas).
 There is a Gorgas Avenue in the Presidio in San Francisco, California.
 In 1984 the "Major General William C. Gorgas Clinic" was dedicated as part of the Mobile County Health Department, located at 251 North Bayou Street, Mobile, AL 
 Gorgas's papers are held at the National Library of Medicine in Bethesda, Maryland.
 There is a Gorgas Road on Fort Myer, Virginia

See also
 Health measures during the construction of the Panama Canal
 Postage stamps and postal history of the Canal Zone
 Sanitation
 Vector control
 Tropical disease
 Miasma theory of disease

References

 From the brochure "150 Year Celebration of the U.S. Marine Hospital/Mobile County Health Department" – December 15, 1993 – Bernard H. Eichold, II M.D., Dr. P.H., Health Officer

Further reading

 Ashburn, P.M., History of the Medical Department of the U.S. Army, 1929.
 Gibson, John M., Physician to the World: The Life of General William C. Gorgas, Durham, North Carolina: Duke University Press, 1950.
 Gorgas, Marie and Burton J. Hendrick, William Crawford Gorgas: His Life and Work, New York: Doubleday, 1924.
 Mellander, Gustavo A., Mellander, Nelly, Charles Edward Magoon: The Panama Years. Río Piedras, Puerto Rico: Editorial Plaza Mayor. ISBN 1-56328-155-4. OCLC 42970390. (1999)
 Mellander, Gustavo A., The United States in Panamanian Politics: The Intriguing Formative Years." Danville, Ill.: Interstate Publishers. OCLC 138568. (1971)
 Phalen, James M., "Chiefs of the Medical Department, U.S. Army 1775–1940, Biographical Sketches," Army Medical Bulletin, No. 52, April 1940, pp. 88–93.
 
 Endorsements, Resolutions and other Data in Behalf of the Nomination of Dr. William Crawford Gorgas for Election to the New York Hall of Fame for Great Americans, 2 vols., Birmingham: Gorgas Hall of Fame Committee, 1950.

Obituaries:

External links

 Video: William Gorgas Biography on Health.mil – The Military Health System provides a look at the life and work of William Gorgas.
 The Gorgas Memorial Institute, University of Alabama
 The Gorgas Courses in Clinical Tropical Medicine
 Gorgas Memorial Institute Research Award (ASTMH Website)
 Gorgas Memorial Library, at the Walter Reed Army Institute of Research
 Alabama Hall of Fame Bio
 The Gorgas TB Initiative
 Gorgas Science Foundation Website
 Mobile County Health Department – Maj. Gen. William C. Gorgas Clinic
 William Crawford Gorgas papers, W.S. Hoole Special Collections Library, The University of Alabama
 

1854 births
1920 deaths
Surgeons General of the United States Army
Panama Canal
Malariologists
Walter Reed
Military personnel from Mobile, Alabama
Sewanee: The University of the South alumni
United States Army generals of World War I
United States Army generals
Burials at Arlington National Cemetery
United States Army Medical Corps officers
Recipients of the Distinguished Service Medal (US Army)
Honorary Knights Commander of the Order of St Michael and St George
Physicians from Alabama
Hall of Fame for Great Americans inductees
American tropical physicians
Georgists
Presidents of the American Medical Association